Lescure may refer to:

Places 
 Lescure, Ariège, a commune in the Ariège departement in the Midi-Pyrénées region in southern France
 Lescure-Jaoul, a commune in the Aveyron departement in the Midi-Pyrénées region in France
 Lescure-d'Albigeois, a commune in the Tarn departement in the Midi-Pyrénées region in France
 Lescure Park Stadium, former name of the soccer and rugby Chaban-Delmas Stadium, in Bordeaux, France

People 
 Emmanuel Lescure (?-2017), French businessman
 Jean Lescure, French poet
 Louis Marie de Lescure, French soldier and opponent of the French Revolution
 Louis-Frédéric Lescure (1904-1993), French industrialist
 Pierre Lescure, French journalist and television executive